The Thailand Open was a professional tennis tournament played on indoor hard courts. It was part of the ATP World Tour 250 series of the ATP Tour. It was held annually in Bangkok, Thailand, in the third week of September, since 2003.

From 2005 to 2007, a WTA Tier III, the PTT Bangkok Open, was also held in the region before being discontinued.

Roger Federer is the only man to have won the singles competition more than once, in 2004 and 2005, while Andy Ram and Jonathan Erlich are the only doubles pair to have won the competition multiple times, in 2003 and 2006. In 2007, Sonchat Ratiwatana and Sanchai Ratiwatana became the first Thai champions of the event, winning in the final against Wimbledon doubles champion Michaël Llodra, and partner Nicolas Mahut. In November 2013 the ATP announced that the tournament would be relocated to Shenzhen, China.

Past finals

Singles

Doubles

See also
 Thailand Open (Pattaya) – women's tournament

References

 
2003 establishments in Thailand
2013 disestablishments in Thailand
Tennis
Tennis
ATP Tour
Hard court tennis tournaments
September sporting events
Recurring sporting events established in 2003
Recurring events disestablished in 2013
Tennis
Tennis
Tennis in Bangkok
Tennis tournaments in Thailand
Defunct tennis tournaments in Thailand